Lamin Sanneh (May 24, 1942 – January 6, 2019) was the D. Willis James Professor of Missions and World Christianity at Yale Divinity School and Professor of History at Yale University.

Biography
Sanneh was born and raised in Gambia as part of an ancient African royal family, and was a naturalized United States citizen. After studying at the University of Birmingham and the Near East School of Theology, Beirut, he earned his doctorate in Islamic History at the University of London. Sanneh taught and worked at the University of Ghana, the University of Aberdeen, Harvard, and, from 1989–2019, at Yale. He was an editor-at-large of The Christian Century, and served on the board of several other journals. Sanneh had honorary doctorates from University of Edinburgh and Liverpool Hope University.

He was a Commandeur de l'Ordre National du Lion, Senegal's highest national honor. He was a member of the Pontifical Commission of the Historical Sciences and of the Pontifical Commission on Religious Relations with Muslims. In 2018, a new institute was created in his name, the Sanneh Institute at the University of Ghana. The Overseas Ministry Study Center (OMSC) at Princeton Theological Seminary created a research grant named in honor of Sanneh.

Sanneh suffered a stroke and died on January 6, 2019. He was survived by his wife, Sandra Sanneh, a professor of isiZulu at Yale University, and their children Sia Sanneh, a senior attorney at the Equal Justice Initiative, and Kelefa Sanneh, staff writer for The New Yorker.

Christianity and Islam 
Sanneh converted to Christianity from Islam and was a practicing Roman Catholic. Much of his scholarship related to the relationship between Christianity and Islam, especially in Africa and what he understood as "African Islam."

World Christianity 
Another major area of Sanneh's academic work was in the study of World Christianity. In his Translating the Message (1989), Sanneh wrote about the significance of the translation of the Christian message into mother-tongue languages in places like Africa and Asia. Instead of the dominant view that Christian mission primarily propagated "cosmopolitan values of an ascendant West," he argues, "The translation role of missionaries cast them as unwitting allies of mother-tongue speakers and as reluctant opponents of colonial domination." He continued to develop these reflections in his  Disciples of All Nations (2008).

Selected books
 
 
 
 
 
 
 
 
  (with Lesslie Newbigin and Jenny Taylor)
 
  (Winner: Theologos Award for "Best General Interest Book 2004")
  (co-edited with Joel A. Carpenter)
 
 
 
  (co-edited with Michael McClymond

References

External links

Yale Divinity School
History Faculty Page at Yale
2011 Article By Ray Waddle

1942 births
2019 deaths
Gambian academics
Gambian Roman Catholics
Gambian former Muslims
Gambian emigrants to the United States
African-American Catholics
American people of Gambian descent
Converts to Roman Catholicism from Islam
Janjanbureh
Alumni of the University of London
Yale Divinity School faculty
Academic staff of the University of Ghana
Missiologists
World Christianity scholars